= Protein premium =

The wheat protein premium refers to the price differential (expressed as cents or dollars per bushel) that a high-protein wheat normally commands over wheat of the same grade specification with lower protein content. Typically, northern dark spring wheat has higher protein and brings a premium price over hard red winter wheat.
